Hyposmocoma pittospori is a species of moth of the family Cosmopterigidae. It was first described by Otto Swezey in 1920. It is endemic to the Hawaiian island of Oahu. The type locality is Kuliouou.

External links

pittospori
Endemic moths of Hawaii
Moths described in 1920